Jón Atli Jónasson (born 1972 in Reykjavík) is an Icelandic playwright and screenwriter. He has written for several films. He is a founding member of the Mindgroup, a European umbrella group of people involved in experimental theater. Considered one of the foremost Icelandic playwrights, he has refused to accept nominations from Gríman, the Icelandic Theater Awards.

References

External links

 
 Jón Atli Jónasson's FaceBook page

1972 births
Living people
Icelandic dramatists and playwrights
Icelandic writers
People from Reykjavík